PSOTY (originally known as Pet Slimmers of the Year) is an English post-rock/post-metal band from Peterborough, Cambridgeshire, England. The band was founded in January 2008 by guitarist and vocalist Scott Gowan, bass guitarist Steve McKenna and drummer Dale Vinten; second guitarist Adrian Lawson joined the band in October 2016. In August 2014, the band changed its name to only the initials of Pet Slimmers of the Year.

The band released its eponymous debut EP in January 2009, followed by the ...And the Sky Fell EP in June 2010, both on the British netlabel Lost Children. Pet Slimmers of the Year contributed the exclusive song "Brujas" to Canadian record label Abridged Pause Recordings' Various Artists compilation Diluvian Temperals, which was released in August 2009. The band later contributed another exclusive song, "Untitled", to Abridged Pause Recordings' Various Artists compilation Billowing Tempestus, in April 2016. 

In August 2013, Pet Slimmers of the Year released the single "Days Since I Disappeared" through Anchor Music, on the strength of which the band was signed to a three-album deal by British extreme metal record label Candlelight Records. The song later appeared on the record label's Various Artists compilation Candlelight Records Presents: Legion III, released in April 2014. The band's debut full-length album, Fragments of Uniforms, was first released as a limited edition CD through Anchor Music in October 2013, before it was officially released via Candlelight Records on CD and digitally in April 2014. A coloured double-LP version followed on Back on Black Records in June 2014. 

In 2016, PSTOY joined the Spinefarm Records and Universal Music Group roster, and followed up with its sophomore full-length album, Sunless, released on CD, double-LP and digitally in September 2019. The album was preceded by the single "Oil Blood" in July 2019, and followed by "King of Ephyra" at the time of the album's release in September 2019.

Members 

 Scott Gowan - guitar, vocals (2008–present)
 Steve McKenna - bass guitar (2008–present)
 Dale Vinten - drums (2008–present)
 Adrian Lawson - guitar (2016–present)

Timeline

Discography 
Studio albums

 Fragments of Uniforms (Anchor Music/Candlelight, 2014)
 Sunless (Candlelight/Spinefarm/Universal, 2019)

EPs

 Why Won't You Die (self-released, 2008)
 Pet Slimmers of the Year (Lost Children, 2009)
 ...And the Sky Fell (Lost Children, 2010)

Singles

 "Brujas" (Abridged Pause, 2009)
 "Days Since I Disappeared" (Anchor Music, 2013)
 "Untitled" (Abridged Pause, 2016)
 "Oil Blood" (Candlelight/Spinefarm/Universal, 2019)
 "King of Ephyra" (Candlelight/Spinefarm/Universal, 2019)

References

External links 

 
 

2008 establishments in England
British instrumental musical groups
Candlelight Records artists
English post-rock groups
Musical groups established in 2008
Musical groups from Cambridgeshire
Musical quartets
Musical trios
Post-metal musical groups
Spinefarm Records artists
Universal Music Group artists